Broadway: The Golden Age is a 2003 documentary film by Rick McKay, telling the story of the "golden age" of Broadway by the oral history of the legendary actors of the 1940s and 1950s, incorporating rare lost footage of actual performances and never-before-seen personal home movies and photos.  This was the final film Sally Ann Howes starred in before her death in 2021.

Subjects
The film includes interviews (filmed over a span of six years) with the following people:

Edie Adams
Beatrice Arthur
Elizabeth Ashley
Alec Baldwin
Kaye Ballard
Bryan Batt
Betsy Blair
Tom Bosley
Carol Burnett
Kitty Carlisle
Carol Channing
Betty Comden
Barbara Cook
Carole Cook
Hume Cronyn
Arlene Dahl
Charles Durning
Daisy Eagan
Fred Ebb
Nanette Fabray
Cy Feuer
Bonnie Franklin
Betty Garrett
Ben Gazzara
Robert Goulet
Farley Granger
Tammy Grimes
Uta Hagen
Sheldon Harnick
Julie Harris
Rosemary Harris
June Havoc
Ruthie Henshall
Jerry Herman
Al Hirschfeld
Celeste Holm
Sally Ann Howes
Kim Hunter
Jeremy Irons
Anne Jackson
Derek Jacobi
Simon Jones
Lainie Kazan
John Kenley
Michael John LaChiusa
Martin Landau
Frank Langella
Angela Lansbury
Arthur Laurents
Carol Lawrence
Michele Lee
Hal Linden
Cameron Mackintosh
Shirley MacLaine
Karl Malden
Donna McKechnie
Ann Miller
Liliane Montevecchi
Patricia Morison
Robert Morse
James Naughton
Patricia Neal
Phyllis Newman
The Nicholas Brothers
Jerry Orbach
Janis Paige
Amanda Plummer
Jane Powell
Hal Prince
John Raitt
Lee Roy Reams
Rex Reed
Charles Nelson Reilly
Diana Rigg
Chita Rivera
Joan Roberts
Tony Roberts
Mary Rodgers
Gena Rowlands
Eva Marie Saint
Marian Seldes
Vincent Sherman
Douglas Sills
Stephen Sondheim
Maureen Stapleton
Elaine Stritch
Mary Testa
Tommy Tune
Leslie Uggams
Gwen Verdon
Eli Wallach
Thommie Walsh
Wendy Wasserstein
Fay Wray
Gretchen Wyler
Karen Ziemba

The intrinsic value of the documentary as a historical record is underscored by the fact that seven of the interviewees (Hume Cronyn, Uta Hagen, Al Hirschfeld, Kim Hunter, Ann Miller, Harold Nicholas and Gwen Verdon) died before the film was released in June 2004, and another 51 interviewees have died since then (as of September 2021). Filmmaker Michael Stever shared some noteworthy recollections of his 3+ years as UPM with McKay after his passing in 2018.

Reception
Broadway: The Golden Age won the Audience Award for Best Documentary at the Palm Beach International Film Festival, the Audience Choice Award for Best documentary at the Santa Barbara International Film Festival, and the Audience Award and Festival Award at the San Diego Film Festival, both for Best Documentary.

In 2006, McKay was honored with a Special Award for his work on the film by the New England Theatre Conference with the New England Theatre Conference Special Contribution to Theatre Award.

Sequel
A sequel by the name of Broadway: Beyond the Golden Age had been in development since the release of the original documentary. McKay successfully funded a Kickstarter campaign in 2017 to help get the film completed, but his untimely passing in 2018 made its future uncertain. It premiered August 14, 2021 on PBS as part of Great Performances.

References

External links 
 
 
 

2003 films
Documentary films about Broadway theatre
American documentary films
2003 documentary films
2000s English-language films
2000s American films